This was the first edition of the tournament.

Natela Dzalamidze and Kaja Juvan won the title, defeating Katarzyna Piter and Mayar Sherif in the final, 6–3, 6–4. This was the maiden WTA Tour doubles title for both Dzalamidze and Juvan.

Seeds

Draw

Draw

References
Main Draw

Winners Open - Doubles